Rabbi Tzvi Hirsch Ferber (1879 – November 1966) was a Talmudic and Torah scholar, gifted orator, prolific author and tireless community builder. A man of outstanding knowledge and talent, he was an exemplar of old-world Lithuanian Torah scholarship and sagacity.

Born in Kovno, Lithuania, Rabbi Ferber studied in the prestigious Slabodka yeshiva, as well as under such Talmudic and Mussar giants as Rabbi Yitzchak Elchanan Spektor, Rabbi Yitzchak Blazer and Rabbi Naftali Amsterdam. He came to Manchester, England in 1911, where he founded a yeshiva along with Rabbi Yehoshua Dov Silverstone.

Biography
Tzvi Hirsch was born to his parents Shimon Yehuda Leib (died 9 March 1906) and Chana Devorah (died 29 December 1911) Farber (note the spelling) in Slabodka/Kovno in about 1878. He married Fraida the daughter of Tzvi Yosef Goldberg (died 6 June 1923), great granddaughter of Rabbi Zev Wolf Lipkin, the Av Beth Din of Goldingen and Telz (the Ben Aryeh, author of glosses on the Talmud & Rishonim; died 18 May 1858) and great niece of Rav Yisrael Salanter Lipkin (died 2 February 1883; Father of the Musar Movement).

The name Tzvi Hirsch is a bilingual tautological name in Yiddish. It means literally "deer-deer" and is traceable back to the Hebrew word צבי tsvi "deer" and the German word Hirsch "deer".

London
In July 1913, he accepted a call to become Rabbi of the West End Talmud Torah Synagogue in Soho, London, a disorganised community of working-class Jewish immigrants of Eastern European origin. In a short span of time, Rabbi Ferber successfully centralised the unorganised Jewish activities and religious life of the community into one institution.

Active in communal affairs, Rabbi Ferber established the Chesed V’emeth Burial Society in 1915. He helped found the London yeshiva and was for many years the honorary secretary of the London "Vaad Harabonim" (rabbinical council) and chairman of the Association of London Rabbis ("Hisachdus Harabonim"). A member of its World Rabbinical council, Rabbi Ferber gave valuable assistance to the Agudas Yisroel movement. He closely collaborated with Rabbi Dr M Jung and Rabbi Dr V Schonfeld in Shechita and other communal issues. He was a friend of Rabbi Avraham Yitzchak Kook, Chief Rabbi of Palestine, from the time that the latter was Rabbi of Machzike Hadath in London.

Rabbi Ferber was hugely admired and venerated by his congregants and colleagues worldwide. Indeed, when he left his seat, everyone stood up and bowed towards him as a sign of respect. He was described as a “man of saintliness and gentleness, loved and admired by all who came into contact with him”. One of the most riveting Jewish orators of his day, he preached his sermons in Yiddish, and could bring his congregation to tears of nostalgia, or “get everyone laughing within the space of two sentences".

Rabbi Ferber was rabbi of Soho for 42 years, from 1913 until his retirement in 1955. He died in 1966 in London, survived by his son Rabbi Jacob Ferber and four older daughters.

The eldest daughter Hoda Malka (Eda) married the teacher, editor and poet Chaim Lewis. Eda was an early female marriage counsellor in post war London. Chaim Lewis published the prize winning memoir 'A Soho Address' (Gollancz, 1965) and several books of poetry and was editor of The Jewish Review periodical in South Africa.
 
The second daughter Feiga Leah (Fanny) was married to Rabbi Moshe (Morris) Davidson, Rabbi of the South West London United synagogue, who obtained his smicha from Rav Elya Lopian at Etz Chaim yeshiva, London.

The third daughter Anne  took care of her father in his later years.

The fourth daughter Liba (Lilly) married Rabbi Shlomo Pesach Toperoff, who first served as rabbi of Sunderland and then as Rabbi of Newcastle upon Tyne. He authored of many prolific works including Lev Avot, Echod Mi Yodea, Eternal Life a handbook for the mourner, and The Animal Kingdom in Jewish Thought.

Scholarship
In the world of Torah, Rabbi Ferber was renowned as an outstanding scholar and sage. A prolific author, he produced 22 acclaimed works of Torah scholarship, perhaps the largest ever output by a Rabbi in England. He was also a frequent contributor to numerous Hebrew journals and an avid reader in the Hebrew collections of the British Library. Taking advantage of his location in the West End, he visited the Oriental Reading Room of the British Museum every day.

Works

Kerem HaTzvi – 5 volume work on the Torah (Beraishis, Shemos, Vayikra, Bamidbar and Devarim)  and Haggada, Rabbi Ferber's seminal work, issued between 1920 and 1938
Degel Machane Yehudah – dealing with the influence of some archaeological finds on Torah interpretation (1925)
Shvil HaTzvi - commentary on Megillas Esther (1933) 
Aishes Chayil - commentary on Aishes Chayil (1934)
Birur Halacha - on civil marriages and divorce in Jewish law (1937)
Kiryas Chana David - about King David (1950)
Sefer Hamo'adim - volume of sermons (1950)
Hegyonei Tzvi - on the end of days in Judaism (1952)
Chamudei Tzvi - thoughts on the festivals and special periods of the year (1953)
Hegyonei Avos - commentary on Pirkei Avos (1954)
Siach Tzvi - commentary on prayer (1955)
Kerem HaTorah (1956)
Zivchei Todah - on Torah, prayer and Pirkei Avos (1957)
His works are now being republished by his descendants.

References 

 Jewish Chronicle archival material
 Short obituary in HaPardes, Rabbinic journal (page 38, Hebrew)
 Rebi Eliezer Gordon, page 176

1879 births
1966 deaths
20th-century English rabbis
Bible commentators
British Orthodox rabbis
British people of Lithuanian-Jewish descent
Rabbis from London
English Orthodox rabbis
Haredi rabbis in Europe
Emigrants from the Russian Empire to the United Kingdom
Lithuanian Haredi rabbis
Writers from Kaunas
Writers from London
Date of birth missing
Date of death missing